Tomești is a commune in Hunedoara County, Transylvania, Romania. It is composed of eight villages: Dobroț (Dobroc), Leauț (Lyauc), Livada (Sztrimba), Obârșa (Obersia), Șteia (Steja), Tiulești (Tyiulesd), Tomești and Valea Mare de Criș (Valeamare).

References

Communes in Hunedoara County
Localities in Transylvania